Charles Van Dell Johnson (August 25, 1916 – December 12, 2008) was an American film, television, theatre and radio actor. He was a major star at Metro-Goldwyn-Mayer during and after World War II.

Johnson was described as the embodiment of the "boy-next-door wholesomeness" which made him a popular Hollywood star in the 1940s and 1950s, playing "the red-haired, freckle-faced soldier, sailor, or bomber pilot who used to live down the street" in MGM films during the war years, with such films as Thirty Seconds Over Tokyo, A Guy Named Joe, and The Human Comedy. He made occasional World War II films through the end of the 1960s, and he played a military officer in one of his final feature films in 1992. At the time of his death in 2008, he was one of the last surviving matinee idols of Hollywood's "golden age".

Early life
Johnson was born in Newport, Rhode Island, the only child of Loretta (née Snyder) and Charles E. Johnson, a plumber and later a real-estate salesman. His father was born in Sweden and came to the United States as a child, and his mother had Pennsylvania Dutch ancestry. His mother was allegedly an alcoholic who left the family when he was a child, and he was not close to his father.

Career

Johnson performed at social clubs in Newport while in high school. He moved to New York City after graduation in 1935 and joined the off-Broadway revue Entre Nous.

Broadway
Johnson toured New England in a theater troupe as a substitute dancer, but his acting career began in earnest in the Broadway revue New Faces of 1936. He returned to the chorus after that and worked in summer resorts near New York City. In 1939, director and playwright George Abbott cast him in Rodgers and Hart's Too Many Girls in the role of a college boy and as understudy for all three male leads. He had an uncredited role in the film adaptation of Too Many Girls, which costarred Lucille Ball and Desi Arnaz, then Abbott hired him as a chorus boy and Gene Kelly's understudy in Pal Joey.

Warner Bros.
Johnson was about to move back to New York when Lucille Ball took him to Chasen's Restaurant, where she introduced him to MGM casting director Billy Grady who was sitting at the next table. This led to screen tests by Hollywood studios. His test at Columbia Pictures was unsuccessful, but Warner Brothers put him on contract at $300 a week. He was cast as a cub reporter opposite Faye Emerson in the 1942 film Murder in the Big House. His eyebrows and hair were dyed black for the role. Johnson's all-American good looks and easy demeanor were ill-suited to the gritty movies that Warner made at the time, and the studio dropped him at the expiration of his six-month contract.

MGM
Johnson was soon signed by Metro-Goldwyn-Mayer. The studio provided him with classes in acting, speech, and diction. He then had an uncredited part as a soldier in Somewhere I'll Find You (1942). He attracted attention in a small part in The War Against Mrs. Hadley (1942), and this encouraged MGM to cast him in their long-running series Dr. Kildare. These films had starred Lew Ayres as Dr. Kildare and Lionel Barrymore as Dr. Gillespie; Ayres' career was hurt due to being a conscientious objector, so the series focused on Dr. Gillespie mentoring new doctors. Johnson played Dr. Randall Adams in Dr. Gillespie's New Assistant (1942).

MGM then cast Johnson as Mickey Rooney's soldier brother in The Human Comedy (1943), a huge hit. He returned as Randall Adams in Dr. Gillespie's Criminal Case (1943) and was in uniform again for Pilot No. 5 (1943). He had a small role as a reporter in Madame Curie (1943).

A Guy Named Joe and stardom
Johnson's big break was in A Guy Named Joe starring Spencer Tracy and Irene Dunne, in which he played a young pilot who acquires a deceased pilot as his guardian angel. Midway through the movie's production in 1943, Johnson was involved in a serious car accident that left him with a metal plate in his forehead and a number of scars on his face that the plastic surgery of the time could not completely correct or conceal; he used heavy makeup to hide them for years. MGM wanted to replace him in A Guy Named Joe,  but Tracy insisted that he be allowed to finish the picture, despite his long absence. The film was a huge hit, earning a profit of over a million dollars and Johnson was launched as a star.

Johnson's injuries from the car accident exempted him from service in World War II. Many other actors were serving in the armed forces, so the accident greatly benefited Johnson's career. He later said, "There were five of us. There was Jimmy Craig, Bob Young, Bobby Walker, Peter Lawford, and myself. All tested for the same part all the time." Johnson was very busy, often playing soldiers; he joked of this period, "I remember… finishing one Thursday morning with June Allyson and starting a new one Thursday afternoon with Esther Williams. I didn't know which branch of the service I was in!"

MGM built up Johnson's image as the all-American boy in war dramas and musicals. His first top-billed role in an "A" picture was the musical Two Girls and a Sailor (1944) which was a big success; it was his first film with June Allyson. He had a smaller part in The White Cliffs of Dover (1944), then reprised his role as Dr. Adams in 3 Men in White (1944).

Post-war career peak
Johnson played Ted Lawson in Thirty Seconds Over Tokyo (1944) which told the story of the Doolittle Raid on Tokyo in April 1942. He played Dr. Adams one last time in Between Two Women (1945). He starred in Thrill of a Romance (1945), a musical with Esther Williams, and Week-End at the Waldorf (1945), a musical remake of Grand Hotel with Lana Turner, Walter Pidgeon, and Ginger Rogers. In 1945, he tied with Bing Crosby as the top box office stars.

He was reunited with Williams in Easy to Wed (1946), a musical remake of Libeled Lady. He supported Spencer Tracy and Katharine Hepburn in State of the Union (1948), and he supported Clark Gable and Pidgeon in the war drama Command Decision (1948).

MGM under Dore Schary
20th Century Fox borrowed Johnson to make the comedy Mother Is a Freshman (1948) with Loretta Young. Back at MGM, he was given a role in the film noir Scene of the Crime (1949). In 1949, he starred with Judy Garland in In the Good Old Summertime, which also marked the first film appearance of Liza Minnelli as Garland's and Johnson's young daughter. He next worked in Battleground (1949), a movie about the Battle of the Bulge produced by MGM's new studio head Dore Schary.

Johnson made the comedy The Big Hangover (1950), then was reunited with Williams in Duchess of Idaho (1951). He appeared in the romantic comedy Three Guys Named Mike (1951). He played an officer leading Japanese-American troops of the famed 442nd Regimental Combat Team in Europe in the Schary-produced film Go for Broke! (1951). He had a small part in It's a Big Country (1951) and was reunited with Allyson for Too Young to Kiss (1951). MGM lent him to Columbia for The Caine Mutiny (1954) in the role of Stephen Maryk. He refused to allow concealment of his facial scars when being made up as Maryk, believing that they enhanced the character's authenticity. Herman Wouk describes Maryk as having "ugly but not unpleasant features" in the novel. One commentator noted years later that "Humphrey Bogart and Jose Ferrer chomp up all the scenery in this maritime courtroom drama, but it's Johnson's character, the painfully ambivalent, not-too-bright Lieutenant Steve Maryk, who binds the whole movie together." Time Magazine commented that Johnson "was a better actor than Hollywood usually allowed him to be."

Johnson next teamed with Gene Kelly as the sardonic second lead of Brigadoon (1954). He had the lead in The Last Time I Saw Paris (1954), his last film for MGM. He had a five-year contract with Columbia to make one film a year.

Unlike some other stars of that era, Johnson did not resent the restrictions of the studio system. In 1985, he said that his years at MGM were "one big happy family and a little kingdom". "Everything was provided for us, from singing lessons to barbells. All we had to do was inhale, exhale and be charming. I used to dread leaving the studio to go out into the real world, because to me the studio was the real world."

Freelancer
During the 1950s, Johnson continued to appear in films and also appeared frequently in television guest appearances.  He appeared as the celebrity mystery guest on What's My Line? airing on November 22, 1953, but was not questioned by the panel due to advance notice of his appearance.  He then appeared again on the May 22, 1955 airing and was guessed by Fred Allen.  He was in The End of the Affair (1955) at Columbia then made The Bottom of the Bottle (1956) at Fox. He received favorable critical notices for the 1956 dramatic film Miracle in the Rain, co-starring Jane Wyman, in which he played a good-hearted young soldier preparing to go to war, and in the mystery 23 Paces to Baker Street, in which he played a blind playwright residing in London.  He returned to MGM for Slander (1956) and Action of the Tiger (1957).

Johnson appeared as the title character of the highly rated "spectacular," The Pied Piper of Hamelin, a musical version of Robert Browning's poem, set to the music of Edvard Grieg. Featuring Claude Rains in his only singing and dancing role, it aired on  November 26, 1957, as part of NBC's week of Thanksgiving specials. The program was so successful it spawned a record album and was repeated in 1958. Syndicated to many local stations, it was rerun annually for many years in the tradition of other holiday specials.

On February 19, 1959, Johnson appeared in the episode "Deadfall" of CBS's Dick Powell's Zane Grey Theater in the role of Frank Gilette, a former outlaw falsely charged with bank robbery. He is framed by Hugh Perry, a corrupt prosecutor played by Harry Townes, and Deputy Stover, portrayed by Bing Russell. Convicted of the robbery, Gilette is captured by outlaws while on his way to prison, and the sheriff, Roy Lamont, portrayed by Grant Withers, is killed.

In 1959, Johnson turned down an opportunity to star as Eliot Ness in The Untouchables, which went on to become a successful television series with Robert Stack as Ness.

Johnson guest-starred as Joe Robertson, with June Allyson and Don Rickles, in the 1960 episode "The Women Who" of the CBS anthology series The DuPont Show with June Allyson.  In 1961 Johnson traveled to England to star in Harold Fielding's production of The Music Man at the Adelphi Theatre in London. The show enjoyed a successful run of almost a year, with Johnson playing the arduous leading role of Harold Hill to great acclaim.

Johnson also guest-starred on Batman as "The Minstrel" in two episodes (39 and 40) in 1966.  In the 1970s, he appeared on Here's Lucy, Quincy, M.E., McMillan & Wife and Love, American Style. He played a lead character in the 1976 miniseries Rich Man, Poor Man, and was nominated for a prime time Emmy Award for that role. In the 1980s, he appeared on an episode of Angela Lansbury's Murder, She Wrote along with June Allyson.  He also appeared in a special two-part episode of The Love Boat, "The Musical: My Ex-Mom; The Show Must Go On; The Pest, Parts 1 and 2" which aired on February 27, 1982, and co-starred Ann Miller, Ethel Merman, Della Reese, Carol Channing, and Cab Calloway.

In the 1970s, after twice fighting bouts of cancer, Johnson began a second career in summer stock and dinner theater. In 1985, returning to Broadway for the first time since Pal Joey, he was cast in the starring role of the musical La Cage aux Folles. In that same year he appeared in a supporting role in Woody Allen's The Purple Rose of Cairo. At the age of 75, now grey and rotund, he toured in Show Boat as Captain Andy. His last film appearance was in Three Days to a Kill (1992). In 2003, he appeared with Betsy Palmer for three performances of A. R. Gurney's Love Letters at a theater in Wesley Hills, New York.

Personal life
Johnson married former stage actress Eve Abbott (1914–2004) on January 25, 1947, the day after her divorce was finalized from actor Keenan Wynn. Their daughter Schuyler was born in 1948. By this marriage, Johnson gained stepsons Edmond Keenan (Ned) and screenwriter Tracy Keenan Wynn. In a statement by Eve, published after her death at age 90, she said MGM had engineered her marriage to Johnson to cover up his alleged homosexuality. "They needed their 'big star' to be married to quell rumors about his sexual preferences and unfortunately, I was 'It'the only woman he would marry." Commenting on their complicated relationships, Keenan Wynn's father Ed Wynn said, "I can't keep them straight. Evie loved Keenan. Keenan loves Evie. Van loves Evie. Evie loves Van. Van loves Keenan. Keenan loves Van."

Johnson's biographer Ronald L. Davis writes that it "seems to have been well known in the film capital" that Johnson had homosexual tendencies, but this was never reported or hinted at by newspaper columnists or movie magazine writers during the era when Johnson made movies. Studio executive Louis B. Mayer made strenuous efforts to quash any potential scandal regarding Johnson and any of his actor-friends whom Mayer suspected of being homosexual. Johnson's marriage to Eve Abbott ended four years after Mayer’s death when Johnson, performing as Professor Harold Hill in The Music Man on the legitimate stage in the West End in London, United Kingdom, began an affair with a male dancer in the production, according to her son Ned Wynn. He disclosed that Johnson left her "for a mana boy, really. He's the lead boy dancer." The couple separated in 1961 and their divorce was finalized in 1968.

In contrast to his "cheery Van" screen image, Eve claimed that he was morose and moody because of his difficult early life. She reported that he had little tolerance for unpleasantness and would stride into his bedroom and seclude himself at the slightest hint of trouble. He had a difficult relationship with his father growing up, and he was estranged from his daughter at the time of his death.

Later years and death

Johnson retired from acting in the early 1990s and lived in a penthouse at 405 East 54th Street on Manhattan's East Side. He moved to Tappan Zee Manor in 2002, an assisted living facility in Nyack, New York. He died there on December 12, 2008, at age 92. His remains were cremated.

Legacy
Johnson was never nominated for an Academy Award and, during the height of his career, was noted mainly for his cheerful screen presence. Reflecting on his career after his death, one critic observed that Johnson was "capable of an Oscar-worthy performance, and that's more than most movie stars can claim". For his contribution to the film industry, Johnson has a star on the Hollywood Walk of Fame at 6600 Hollywood Blvd.

Filmography

Box office ranking
For a number of years film exhibitors voted Johnson among the most popular stars in the country:
1945 – 2nd (US)
1946 – 3rd (US)
1950 – 18th (US)
1951 – 24th (US)

Stage work

Radio appearances

References

Notes

Bibliography

 Beecher, Elizabeth. Van Johnson: The Luckiest Guy in the World. Racine, Wisconsin: Whitman Publishing Co., 1947.
 Davis, Ronald. Van Johnson: MGM's Golden Boy. Jackson: University Press of Mississippi, 2001. .
 Eyman, Scott. Lion of Hollywood: The Life and Legend of Louis B. Mayer. New York: Simon & Schuster, 2005. .
 Wayne, Jane Ellen. The Leading Men of MGM. New York: Carroll & Graf, 2006. .
 Wynn, Ned. We Will Always Live in Beverly Hills: Growing Up Crazy in Hollywood. New York: William Morrow & Co., 1990. .

External links

 
 
 
 

1916 births
2008 deaths
Male actors from Rhode Island
American male film actors
American male stage actors
American male radio actors
American male television actors
American people of Pennsylvania Dutch descent
American people of Swedish descent
People from Newport, Rhode Island
Metro-Goldwyn-Mayer contract players
20th-century American male actors
American gay actors
LGBT people from Rhode Island
20th-century American LGBT people